The Android Package with the file extension apk is the file format used by the Android operating system, and a number of other Android-based operating systems for distribution and installation of mobile apps, mobile games and middleware. It can be written in either Java or Kotlin.

APK files can be generated and signed from Android App Bundles.

Overview
APK is analogous to other software packages such as APPX in Microsoft Windows, .app on HAP for HarmonyOS or a Debian package in Debian-based operating systems. To make an APK file, a program for Android is first compiled using a tool such as Android Studio or Visual Studio and then all of its parts are packaged into one container file. An APK file contains all of a program's code (such as .dex files), resources, assets, certificates, and manifest file. As is the case with many file formats, APK files can have any name needed, but it may be required that the file name ends in the file extension for being recognized as such.

Most Android implementations allow users to manually install APK files only after they turn on an "Unknown Sources" setting that allows installation from sources other than trusted ones like Google Play. One may do so for many reasons, such as during the development of apps, to install apps not found on the store, or to install an older version of an existing app.

Use on other operating systems 
Blackberry Limited supported Android 4.1 Jelly Bean apps and up through Android Runtime to now discontinued Blackberry 10 through the January 2014 10.2.1 firmware update. On June 18, 2014, BlackBerry announced an official relationship with Amazon.com, which resulted in the 10.3 update bundling the Amazon Appstore.

At 2015 Build, Microsoft had also announced an Android runtime environment for Windows 10 Mobile known as "Astoria", which would allow Android apps to run in an emulated environment with minimal changes, and have access to Microsoft platform APIs such as Bing Maps and Xbox Live as nearly drop-in replacements for equivalent Google Mobile Services. Google Mobile Services and certain core APIs would not be available, and apps with "deep integration into background tasks" were said to poorly support the environment.

On February 25, 2016, after already having delayed it in November 2015, Microsoft announced that "Astoria" would be shelved, arguing that it was redundant to the native Windows Bridge toolkit since iOS is already a primary target for mobile app development. The company also encouraged use of products from Xamarin (which they had acquired the previous day) for multi-platform app development using C# programming language instead. Portions of Astoria were used as a basis for the Windows Subsystem for Linux (WSL) platform on the PC version of Windows 10.

At the Windows 11 announcement event in June 2021, Microsoft showcased the new Windows Subsystem for Android (WSA) that will enable support for the Android Open Source Project (AOSP) and will allow users to run Android apps on their Windows desktop. Microsoft confirmed users will be able to sideload Android apps onto Windows and that it would be possible to install APK files downloaded from third-party sources.

Google announced plans in December 2021 to bring Android games to Windows in 2022.

Package contents 
An APK file is a ZIP archive that usually contains the following files and directories:
 META-INF directory:
MANIFEST.MF: the Manifest file
 The certificate of the application.
 CERT.SF: The list of resources and a SHA-1 digest of the corresponding lines in the MANIFEST.MF file; for example:Signature-Version: 1.0
Created-By: 1.0 (Android)
SHA1-Digest-Manifest: wxqnEAI0UA5nO5QJ8CGMwjkGGWE=
...
Name: res/layout/exchange_component_back_bottom.xml
SHA1-Digest: eACjMjESj7Zkf0cBFTZ0nqWrt7w=
Name: res/drawable-hdpi/icon.png
SHA1-Digest: DGEqylP8W0n0iV/ZzBx3MW0WGCA=
 lib: the directory containing the compiled code that is platform dependent; the directory is split into more directories within it:
 armeabi-v7a: compiled code for all ARMv7 and above based processors only
 arm64-v8a: compiled code for all ARMv8 arm64 and above based processors only
 x86: compiled code for x86 processors only
 x86_64: compiled code for x86-64 processors only
 mips and armeabi, deprecated since NDK r17
 res: the directory containing resources not compiled into resources.arsc (see below).
 assets: a directory containing applications assets, which can be retrieved by AssetManager.
 AndroidManifest.xml: An additional Android manifest file, describing the name, version, access rights, referenced library files for the application. This file may be in Android binary XML that can be converted into human-readable plaintext XML with tools such as AXMLPrinter2, Apktool M, or Androguard.
 classes.dex: The classes compiled in the dex file format executed by Android Runtime (or by Dalvik virtual machine used in Android 4.4 KitKat).
 resources.arsc: a file containing precompiled resources, such as binary XML for example.

See also 
 Android software development
 .ipa

Further reading

References 

Application package
Archive formats
Windows 11